Qarah Quyun District is in Showt County, West Azerbaijan province, Iran. At the 2006 National Census, its population (as a part of the former Showt District of Maku County) was 13,931 in 3,162 households. The following census in 2011 counted 12,950 people in 3,503 households, by which time the district had been separated from the county, Showt County established, and divided into two districts: the Central and Qarah Quyun Districts. At the latest census in 2016, the district had 12,146 inhabitants in 3,587 households.

References 

Showt County

Districts of West Azerbaijan Province

Populated places in West Azerbaijan Province

Populated places in Showt County